Max de Waal (born 10 January 2002) is a Dutch professional footballer who plays as a midfielder for Eerste Divisie club ADO Den Haag, on loan from Jong Ajax.

Club career

Ajax
De Waal began his football career with Always Forward, based in his hometown Hoorn, for whom he played until 2012. He also played for HV Veerhuys for three years while playing for Always Forward. He then moved to Hollandia for a year before moving to the renowned Ajax youth academy. In 2017–18, he made one appearance for the under-17 team. In the following season he established himself in the team and scored nine goals in 26 games. In 2019–20, De Waal mainly played for the under-19 team, including in the UEFA Youth League.

He made his first appearance for Jong Ajax in the second-tier Eerste Divisie in a match against Jong PSV on 16 September 2019. He came on in the 69th minute for Alex Mendez and scored the 2–0 winner in stoppage time. During the season he was utilised once more in the Eerste Divisie. In the following season, he played more regularly for the Jong Ajax team. However, he would only signed his first professional contract with Jong Ajax in December 2020.

Loans
In January 2022, De Waal extended his contract with Ajax but immediately went out on loan to bottom of the table side PEC Zwolle. He made his debut for the side on 5 February 2022, replacing Mustafa Saymak in the 81st minute of a 1–1 home draw against NEC. De Waal made seven appearances for PEC – all as a substitute – as the club suffered relegation to the Eerste Divisie at the end of the season.

On 24 June 2022, after returning to Ajax, De Waal was sent on a one-season loan to Eerste Divisie club ADO Den Haag. He made his ADO debut under new head coach Dirk Kuyt on the first matchday of the 2022–23 season, starting in midfield in a humiliating 4–0 defeat against recently relegated Heracles Almelo; all goals fell in the first half. On 28 August, De Waal scored his first goal for the club against his parent club Jong Ajax, adding an assist to help ADO to a 4–0 home win.

International career
De Waal has played for two Netherlands national youth teams, but has yet to play in a major tournament.

Career statistics

Club

References

2002 births
Living people
Dutch footballers
Netherlands youth international footballers
Association football midfielders
HVV Hollandia players
AFC Ajax players
Jong Ajax players
PEC Zwolle players
ADO Den Haag players
Eerste Divisie players
Eredivisie players
People from Hoorn
Footballers from North Holland